Colin Baker (born 8 June 1943) is an English actor who played Paul Merroney in the BBC drama series The Brothers from 1974 to 1976 and the sixth incarnation of the Doctor in the long-running science fiction television series Doctor Who from 1984 to 1986. Baker's tenure as the Doctor proved to be a controversial era for the series, which included a hiatus in production and his subsequent replacement on the orders of BBC executive Michael Grade.

Early life
Colin Baker was born in Waterloo, London, England. He moved north to Rochdale with his family when he was three years old. He was educated at St Bede's College, Manchester, where he passed A' Levels in French, Latin and Greek. Particularly strong in Latin and Greek, Baker achieved 2 A grades. He studied law at a London college and subsequently trained to become a solicitor.  At the age of 23, Baker enrolled at the London Academy of Music and Dramatic Art (LAMDA).

Career

Early work in television

Baker's numerous television roles in the early 1970s included a supporting role in a 1970 BBC adaptation of Jean-Paul Sartre's trilogy The Roads to Freedom, a leading role as Count Steinbock in their adaptation of Cousin Bette the following year, playing opposite Margaret Tyzack and Helen Mirren. In 1972 he played Anatole Kuragin, opposite Anthony Hopkins in the BBC adaptation of War and Peace. His regular television work continued and in Fall of Eagles, Baker appeared as Crown Prince Wilhelm of the German Empire.

By far his most prominent role to date came in 1974, playing the ruthless banker Paul Merroney in the BBC Sunday evening series The Brothers. Baker joined the series half-way through its run, as Merroney became one of the leading characters over three and a half series from 1974–76.

After The Brothers, he worked regularly in theatre and his television work became less frequent, although he guest-starred as Bayban the Butcher in a 1980 episode of Blake's 7, "City at the Edge of the World". He had further guest roles on television and in 1983 featured in a BBC production of A.J. Cronin's The Citadel.

Doctor Who (1984–1986)
Baker made his first appearance in Doctor Who as Commander Maxil in the Peter Davison-era story Arc of Infinity (1983). He then became the second of three actors to be cast as the Doctor by producer John Nathan-Turner. Baker's first appearance in the starring role occurred in the final moments of The Caves of Androzani (1984), where he delivered his first few lines. He then made his full story debut the following week in The Twin Dilemma. The serial, and Baker's portrayal of the Doctor, caused immediate controversy, with one scene in which the Doctor attempts to strangle his companion, Peri Brown. According to PopMatters, "Colin Baker's first appearance was just out-and-out dislikable, showcasing a hubris and harshness that was heretofore unseen in the Doctor's emotional canon."

Baker's era was interrupted by an 18-month hiatus which was announced in February 1985, midway through transmission of Season 22, his first full season. The Controller of BBC1 at the time, Michael Grade, criticised Doctor Who, saying that the programme had become overly violent in 1985. Grade later admitted that he "hated" the series, which he described as a "very clunky studio show". One new Doctor Who story, Slipback, was produced for radio during the hiatus, which starred Baker and his regular television companion Nicola Bryant.

Doctor Who returned to television for its 23rd season in September 1986. The season featured a reduction in episodes, was made entirely on video for location scenes and was produced as a 14-episode-long serial called The Trial of a Time Lord. This serial was a meta-textual reference to the fact that the series itself was "on trial" at this time. In 1986 Baker told an interviewer: "Tom Baker did it for seven years. ... There's a part of me which likes to have a tilt at records. I would like to think that maybe I'd still be doing it in eight years' time." However, later that year Grade agreed to commission another series on the condition that Baker was replaced. The BBC's Head of Series, Jonathan Powell, later said that the BBC was looking for "one last chance saloon, for an actor who would take off with the public." However, Davison argued in 2018 that the decision was more to do with the executives wanting to get rid of Nathan-Turner, saying: "I was upset about what happened, really – because, first of all, it wasn't to do with Colin, I know that. It was to do with other issues. The power structure in the BBC had changed and they didn't want John Nathan-Turner around is the truth of it."

Baker was removed from the part after starring in only eleven stories and just short of three years in the series, including the hiatus, making his tenure as the Doctor the shortest at that point. After his sacking, Baker was offered a single four-part story that would end in his character's death and subsequent regeneration, but he refused the offer. Baker offered to do the entirety of the following season and regenerate at its conclusion, but the BBC never responded to his letter. Instead, his replacement, Sylvester McCoy, played the injured Sixth Doctor in a blonde wig as he regenerates in the opening minutes of Time and the Rani, his face hidden by video effects as the regeneration process occurs. In an interview in 2019, Baker expressed regret for not returning for the scene, stating that he was "brutally selfish at the time" and that he was not thinking about the fans.

On 4 September 2011 at Riverside Studios, Hammersmith, London, Baker accepted the presidency of the Doctor Who Appreciation Society, which had previously been held by Jon Pertwee and Nicholas Courtney. He was elected following an online poll of the society's members where he won more votes than all the other candidates combined.

Doctor Who appearances in other media
From 5 June to 19 August 1989, Baker agreed to appear as the Doctor once more, in the stage play Doctor Who – The Ultimate Adventure, taking over from original lead Jon Pertwee who had fallen ill.

In 1992, Baker became the first Doctor to write a published Doctor Who story, The Deal, as part of Doctor Who Magazines Brief Encounters series. He wrote a second Brief Encounter the following year. Both featured the Sixth Doctor and Mel. In 1994 Baker wrote a comic strip, The Age of Chaos featuring the Sixth Doctor and Frobisher, and in 2001 contributed a story entitled "The Wings of A Butterfly" to a charity short story anthology based on Doctor Who, "Missing Pieces". He also presented special Doctor Who videotape releases Cybermen – The Early Years in 1992 and The Colin Baker Years in 1994, with the latter a look back at his tenure on the series highlighted by clips and his memories.

Baker has reprised the role on television only twice after his official run ended, in the 1993 Children in Need charity special Dimensions in Time alongside Pertwee, Tom Baker, Peter Davison and Sylvester McCoy, and in the 2022 special "The Power of the Doctor" alongside David Bradley, Davison, Paul McGann, McCoy and Jodie Whittaker.

In 1997, Baker provided audio dialogue for the BBC video game Doctor Who: Destiny of the Doctors.

1999 saw Baker voice his first Doctor Who audio adventure for Big Finish Productions, The Sirens of Time. These audio plays are generally well received by fans and in a poll conducted by Doctor Who Magazine, Baker was voted the "greatest" of the Doctors in this format. He also reprised the role of Commander Maxil in the Gallifrey audio series story "Appropriation" in 2006; in 2022, he played alternate versions of the Fifth Doctor (known as the Doctor of War) in the Doctor Who Unbound series and the Curator in The Eighth Doctor Adventures.

In recent years, Baker has appeared on a number of DVD releases of his episodes, featuring in either "making-of" documentaries or commentaries. The documentary Trials and Tribulations, included in the 2008 DVD release of The Trial of a Time Lord examines his turbulent three years on the show.

In November 2013, Baker co-starred in the one-off 50th anniversary comedy homage The Five(ish) Doctors Reboot.

After Doctor Who
Since leaving Doctor Who Baker has spent much of his time on the stage with appearances throughout the country in plays as diverse as Peter Nichols' Privates on Parade, Ira Levin's Deathtrap, Ray Cooney's Run for Your Wife and Ariel Dorfman's Death and the Maiden. For many years he has been a pantomime stalwart. In 2000 he appeared in Snow White and the Seven Dwarfs alongside actress Louise Jameson who had previously played the Fourth Doctor's companion Leela. In 2003 he starred in the Carl Rosa Opera Company's production of operetta H.M.S. Pinafore, directed by Timothy West. In 2008, he toured with ex-wife Liza Goddard in She Stoops To Conquer. Other theatre appearances have seen Baker tackle the role of Inspector Morse in House of Ghosts and a UK tour of The Woman in White.
In 1991, Baker played a Doctor-like character in the BBV video series The Stranger. This character appeared in six video adventures as well four audio stories. Another standalone BBV drama entitled The Airzone Solution appeared in 1993 and featured former Doctor Who actors Jon Pertwee, Peter Davison and Sylvester McCoy.Television work during the 1990s included guest appearances in the BBC's medical drama Casualty, The Knock, Dangerfield, the first episode of Jonathan Creek, Channel 4's adaptation of A Dance to the Music of Time and as himself as the resident celebrity in 'Dictionary Corner' on the daytime quiz show Countdown, also on Channel 4.

In 2003, Baker appeared on Top Gear, participating on a one-lap run on the Top Gear track in a Honda Civic hatchback. Baker competed against a Klingon, a Cyberman, a Dalek, Darth Vader and Ming the Merciless. Baker came in 4th position, with the Cyberman coming 1st.

A 2005 guest appearance in comedy sketch show Little Britain was never transmitted but can be seen in the deleted scenes special feature on the Little Britain series 3 DVD. Other television appearances have seen Baker appear in Kingdom, Hustle and Doctors.

Away from his Doctor Who work for Big Finish Productions (see above), Baker appeared in the audio dramas Sapphire and Steel: The Mystery of the Missing Hour and the 3 part Earthsearch Mindwarp. The latter, based on a James Follett novel, was broadcast on the digital radio station BBC 7 in 2006.

In 2010, Baker narrated and provided additional voices for the audiobook version of the sci-fi/comedy novel, Kangazang! Remote Possibilities. Written by Terry Cooper, and published by Candy Jar Books.

Baker's film work over the years includes The Harpist (1999), The Asylum (2000) and D'Artagnan et les trois mousquetaires (2005). In 2010 he filmed scenes for an independent feature film, Shadows of a Stranger. 
Since 1995 Baker has written a regular weekly column for local newspaper Bucks Free Press. A compilation of his articles from 1995 to 2009 were published in the book, Look Who's Talking.

Baker participated in the 12th series of I'm a Celebrity...Get Me Out of Here!, finishing in 8th place out of 12 celebrities.

Personal life
Baker's first wife was actress Liza Goddard who had appeared with him in the TV series The Brothers. Their marriage lasted 18 months and ended in divorce. With his second wife, Marion Wyatt, an actress, whom he married in 1982, Baker has four daughters: Lucy, Bindy, Lalla and Rosie. They also had a son, Jack, who died of sudden infant death syndrome. His wife and daughters appeared in The Five(ish) Doctors Reboot as themselves. Baker is a friend of American writer Stephen R. Donaldson, who dedicated his 1991 novel Forbidden Knowledge to him.

Baker is a critic of fox hunting and was among more than 20 high-profile people who signed a letter to members of parliament in 2015 to oppose Conservative prime minister David Cameron's plan to amend the Hunting Act 2004.

Filmography

Film

Television

Stage

Audio drama 
{| class="wikitable sortable"
!Year
!Title
!Role
!Notes
|-
|1985
|Doctor Who: Slipback
|rowspan=2|Sixth Doctor
|6 mini episodes
|-
|1999–2021
|Doctor Who – The Monthly Adventures
| 82 releases
|-
|2006
|Gallifrey
|Commander Maxil
|Story: "Appropriation"; uncredited
|-
|2009–2012, 2019
|Doctor Who: The Lost Stories
|rowspan="4"|Sixth Doctor
|12 stories
|-
|2011–2018
|Jago & Litefoot
|7 stories
|-
|2016–present
|Doctor Who: Classic Doctors, New Monsters
|2 stories
|-
|2016
|The Diary of River Song
|2 stories
|-
| rowspan="2" |2021
|Avalon
|rowspan=2|Bayban
|Volume Two
|-
|Bayban the Butcher
|
|-
| rowspan="2" |2022
|Doctor Who Unbound
|Doctor of War
|
|-
|Doctor Who: The Eighth Doctor Adventures|The Curator
|
|}

Video games

BibliographyLook Who's Talking (Hirst Books), First Published December 2009. First reprint February 2010 Second Thoughts (Hirst Books), First Published September 2010 Gallimaufry: A Collection of Short Stories. First Published 30 September 2011. .Sixth Sense – from the columns of the Bucks Free Press''. FBS Publishing Ltd. 6 April 2017.

References

External links

 
 
 
 Archive of columns by Baker at the Bucks Free Press
 Another archive of columns by Baker
 Interview with Colin Baker on Dracula and acting for theatre
 Article in the Guardian 30 October 2007

1943 births
20th-century English male actors
21st-century English male actors
Actors from Rochdale
Alumni of the London Academy of Music and Dramatic Art
English male radio actors
English male soap opera actors
English male stage actors
I'm a Celebrity...Get Me Out of Here! (British TV series) participants
Living people
Male actors from London
People educated at St Bede's College, Manchester